Chhavi Pandey is an Indian television actress known for playing Tara in Life OK's Ek Boond Ishq, Namrata Singh in Star Bharat's mystery thriller Kaal Bhairav Rahasya and Prarthana Kashyap in Sony TV's Ladies Special 2.

Career 
Pandey has learnt Kathak (Indian classic dance) and is a professional singer as well. She has learned classical music and light music and is a national scholar from ministry of culture New Delhi in classical music.

Pandey first appeared in India's Got Talent Season 1 on Colors TV in 2008 and finished up as a semi-finalist. She then did a Bhojpuri movie Bidesia opposite Dinesh Lal Yadav. Pandey was in 2011 considered to play the role of Aaliya in Star Plus show Sajda Tere Pyaar Mein which later got played by Deblina Chatterjee. Pandey did in January 2012 sign Star Plus show Sang Mere Dol Tu, a pilot of the show was made but the show got scrapped by the end of 2012. Pandey in August 2012 signed in Star Plus show Daag (later named Ek Hasina Thi) opposite actor Vatsal Seth, but due to some problems she later left the show and was replaced by Sanjeeda Sheikh.

In September 2013, Pandey was seen in the Life OK show Ek Boond Ishq opposite actor Viraf Patel. Pandey played the role of Smita in Teri Meri Love Stories on Star Plus. In 2015, she portrayed the lead role of Darpan in serial Bandhan.

Later in 2016 she appeared in the show Silsila Pyaar Ka on Star Plus. In 2017 she appeared on suspense thriller Kaal Bhairav Rahasya that aired on Star Bharat as Main Female Lead Antagonist. In late 2018, She was offered the Role of Queen Padmini in Vikram Betaal Ki Rahasya Gatha, but later on she denied the role. Till 2019 she played lead role of Prarthna Kashyap in Ladies Special 2.

Filmography

Television

References

External links 

 
 

Indian television actresses
Living people
Actresses from Patna
21st-century Indian actresses
1986 births